Edwin Perkins may refer to:

 Edwin Perkins (inventor) (1889–1961), American inventor of the Kool-Aid powder drink mix
 Edwin King Perkins (1855–1937), British Conservative Party politician
 Ed Perkins (born 1953), Canadian mathematician